The 2010 season was the Seattle Seahawks' 35th in the National Football League (NFL), their ninth playing their home games at Qwest Field and their first under head coach Pete Carroll after Jim Mora was fired on January 8, 2010. The team exceeded their win total from 2009 and won the NFC West with a 7–9 record. They became the first team in a full season to finish with a sub-.500 record and make the playoffs, a berth which was by virtue of winning the division. The 2010 Seahawks also became the first sub-.500 team to win a playoff game with their home win against the defending Super Bowl champion New Orleans Saints remembered as the Beast Quake game, but then had their season ended by the second-seeded Chicago Bears in the divisional round.

Statistics website Football Outsiders calculated that the 2010 Seahawks were the worst team that they had ever rated to qualify for the playoffs.

Offseason

Front office changes
General manager Tim Ruskell resigned from his position two weeks before the 2009 regular season ended. Interim GM Ruston Webster took over until the season ended, but was not retained as GM. However, Webster left the team for a similar position for the Tennessee Titans instead.

Surprisingly, the head coaching vacancy created by Mora's departure was actually filled first by the Seahawks through Pete Carroll. Seahawks CEO Tod Leiweke suggested that Carroll and the GM would have a "collaborative relationship" over control of the team.

Among candidates interviewed for GM were former Tennessee Titans General Manager Floyd Reese and New York Giants scouting director Marc Ross. On January 19, 2010, the Seahawks officially signed Green Bay Packers director of football operations John Schneider as their official General Manager.

Staff changes

Following a disastrous 5–11 season in his first season with the Seahawks, Jim Mora was fired on January 8, 2010. Mora was apparently surprised and disappointed about the news, but Seahawks CEO Tod Leiweke stated that the franchise was moving to a new direction to become successful.

Within days after Mora was relieved as Head Coach, the Seahawks began to interview candidates such as USC Trojans football head coach Pete Carroll, Minnesota Vikings defensive coordinator Leslie Frazier and San Diego Chargers defensive coordinator Ron Rivera. Controversy aroused when news broke out that Carroll was in preliminary agreements to sign a contract as head coach and have full control of the franchise when neither Frazier or Rivera were interviewed, thus potentially breaking the Rooney Rule. However, Frazier agreed to an interview before the Seahawks signed Carroll as coach, thus fulfilling the rule. Two days later, Carroll officially became the 8th head coach in franchise history.

Within days after Carroll was hired, the rest of the coaching staff was revamped. With the exceptions of Gus Bradley and Dan Quinn, none of the coaches from Mora's tenure returned. USC Football offensive coordinator Jeremy Bates joined as the Seahawks offensive coordinator, while Alex Gibbs from the Houston Texans would serve as offensive line coach and assistant head coach. However, weeks before the start of the NFL regular season, Gibbs would suddenly retire from the position, with Carroll's former USC assistant Pat Ruel to take his spot.

Key departures

Wide receiver Nate Burleson, after a four-year stint with the Seahawks, signed with the Detroit Lions on March 5, 2010, after 24 hours of free agency. Backup quarterback Seneca Wallace, known for his versatility as a wide receiver, was sent to the Cleveland Browns on March 8, 2010 in exchange for a conditional 2011 NFL Draft pick.

Guard Rob Sims, who started regularly for the Seahawks for the past four years, was traded to the Lions in exchange for defensive end Robert Henderson and a fifth-round pick in the 2010 NFL Draft. Veteran defensive End Darryl Tapp was also traded to the Philadelphia Eagles in exchange for Chris Clemons and a fourth-round pick.

On April 13, 2010, Defensive end Patrick Kerney announced his retirement after 11 NFL seasons. Kerney made the Pro Bowl in 2007 and led the team in sacks on two occasions (2007 and 2009). On April 29, 2010, Four-time All-Pro Left Tackle Walter Jones also announced his retirement after a 13-year career during which he became a cornerstone of the Seattle Seahawks organization.

During training camp, the Seahawks continued to cut ties with many players. Former first-round pick Lawrence Jackson, who Carroll coached with at USC, was traded to the Detroit Lions for a sixth-round pick. The previous year's starters including fullback Owen Schmitt and wide receiver T. J. Houshmandzadeh were released from the team. Defensive back Josh Wilson was traded to Baltimore for a conditional fifth-round pick.

Key additions

Former San Diego Chargers quarterback Charlie Whitehurst was acquired by Seattle on March 18, 2010. Whitehurst competed for the starting job with Matt Hasselbeck. Also, the Seahawks acquired defensive ends Chris Clemons and Robert Henderson respectively from the Eagles and Lions. Wide receiver Reggie Williams, a former first-round pick with the Jacksonville Jaguars and a former Washington Huskies standout, signed with the Seahawks on April 16, 2010.

On the last day of the 2010 NFL Draft, the Seahawks acquired running back LenDale White and defensive tackle Kevin Vickerson from the Tennessee Titans. With the trade, White would have been reunited with his college coach Pete Carroll from USC, but was cut on May 28. Also, the New York Jets traded former Pro Bowler Leon Washington to Seattle.

2010 NFL Draft

After finishing the 2009 season with a record of 5–11, the Seahawks held the 6th overall pick in the 2010 NFL Draft. They also held the 14th overall pick as a result of a trade in the 2009 NFL Draft that gave their second-round pick 2009 to the Denver Broncos for their first-round pick in 2010. The Seahawks traded their third-round pick to the Philadelphia Eagles as part of a trade from the 2009 draft and gave up their second-round pick in the Charlie Whitehurst deal but also received another second-round pick from the San Diego Chargers

Staff

Final roster

Preseason

Schedule

Game summaries

Week 1: vs. Tennessee Titans

Week 2: vs. Green Bay Packers

Week 3: at Minnesota Vikings

Week 4: at Oakland Raiders

Regular season

Schedule

Bold indicates division opponents.
Source: 2010 NFL season results

Standings

Game summaries

Week 1: vs. San Francisco 49ers

The Seahawks began their season at home for an NFC West rivalry against the San Francisco 49ers. In the first quarter, Seattle trailed early when 49ers kicker Joe Nedney made a 23-yard field goal, which was extended in the second quarter when Nedney made another 23-yard field goal. Then, the Seahawks fought back and took the lead when quarterback Matt Hasselbeck got a 1-yard touchdown run, followed by him making a 13-yard touchdown pass to wide receiver Deon Butler. In the third quarter, Seattle continued to dominate when cornerback Marcus Trufant returned an interception and ran 32 yards for a touchdown. This was followed by Hasselbeck's 3-yard touchdown pass to wide receiver Deion Branch. In the fourth quarter, the Seahawks scored again when kicker Olindo Mare made a 35-yard field goal.

With the win, Seattle began the season at 1–0.

Week 2: at Denver Broncos

Coming off an easy win over the 49ers, the Seahawks flew to INVESCO Field at Mile High for an interconference duel with their former division rival, the Broncos. In the first quarter Seattle trailed early as quarterback Kyle Orton made a 13-yard touchdown pass to wide receiver Eddie Royal, followed in the second quarter by running back Correll Buckhalter getting a 1-yard touchdown run. Then kicker Matt Prater made a 20-yard field goal to put the Broncos up 17–0. In the third quarter Seattle tried to cut the lead when quarterback Matt Hasselbeck completed an 11-yard touchdown pass to wide receiver Ben Obomanu, but Denver scored with running back Knowshon Moreno getting a 1-yard touchdown run. In the fourth quarter Seattle fell further behind when Orton found wide receiver Demaryius Thomas on a 21-yard touchdown pass. Seattle would make the final score of the game when Hasselbeck scrambled 20 yards to the endzone for a touchdown.

With the loss, Seattle fell to 1–1.

Week 3: vs. San Diego Chargers

The Seahawks' third game was played at home ground when they played their former division rival, the San Diego Chargers. In the second quarter Seattle took the early lead when kicker Olindo Mare made a 23-yard field goal. Then quarterback Matt Hasselbeck completed a 9-yard touchdown pass to tight end John Carlson. This was followed in the third quarter by running back Leon Washington returning a kickoff 101 yards to the endzone for a touchdown. The lead was broken down with quarterback Philip Rivers getting a 3-yard touchdown pass to wide receiver Malcolm Floyd, followed by Hasselbeck getting sacked by linebacker Brandon Siler in the endzone for a safety. Then kicker Nate Kaeding made a 29-yard field goal. The Seahawks increased their lead when Mare made a 23-yard field goal, but the Chargers replied and tied the game when Rivers found tight end Antonio Gates on a 12-yard touchdown pass (with a successful two-point conversion as Rivers found wide receiver Legedu Naanee). Before the clock struck zero Seattle took the winning score as running back Leon Washington returned his second kickoff of the game into the endzone running 99 yards for a touchdown. Rivers and the Chargers attempted to make a comeback with less than a minute left, but was picked off by rookie Earl Thomas to seal the win for Seattle.

With the win, Seattle improved to 2–1.

Week 4: at St. Louis Rams

The Seahawks' fourth game was played at Edward Jones Dome where they played an NFC west rivalry match against the Rams. In the first quarter the Seahawks trailed early as quarterback Sam Bradford completed a 15-yard touchdown pass to wide receiver Brandon Gibson. The Seahawks cut the lead with kicker Olindo Mare nailing a 22-yard field goal, but the Rams increased their lead when kicker Josh Brown made a 30-yard field goal, followed in the 3rd quarter by Bradford completing a 21-yard touchdown pass to running back Kenneth Darby. Then Josh Brown made a 31-yard field goal to put the Seahawks further behind.

With the loss, Seattle fell to 2–2 coming into their bye week and their 10-game winning streak against the Rams was snapped.

Week 6: at Chicago Bears

Following a bye week, the Seahawks traveled to Soldier Field and face the Chicago Bears with a new weapon in running back Marshawn Lynch. Chicago quickly scored in the first quarter with a Matt Forte 6-yard run, but Matt Hasselbeck and the offense would respond quickly with a 22-yard touchdown reception by Deon Butler. Seattle would extend the lead to 14–7 with a Justin Forsett touchdown run near the beginning of the 2nd quarter, but two Chicago field goals made by Robbie Gould would bring the Bears to a one-point deficit at halftime. However, Chicago's offense was continuously hampered by the Seahawks' blitzes, roughing up Jay Cutler for 6 sacks and a safety in the 3rd quarter. Lynch would score his first touchdown as a Seahawk later in the game, extending Seattle's lead to 23–13. The Bears tried to rallied within the last few minutes of the game as Devin Hester scored on an 89-yard punt return for a touchdown (his 13th, which tied an NFL record for most punt/kick return touchdowns by a single player), but an onside kick recovered by tight end John Carlson sealed Seattle's first non-division road victory since 2007.

With the win, the Seahawks moved to 3–2.

Week 7: vs. Arizona Cardinals

Coming off their win over the Bears the Seahawks played on home ground for an NFC West rivalry match against the Cardinals. In the first quarter the Seahawks took the lead as kicker Olindo Mare got a 20-yard field goal. Followed in the second quarter by quarterback Matt Hasselbeck making a 2-yard touchdown pass to wide receiver Mike Williams. The Seahawks increased their lead in the 3rd quarter with Mare nailing a 31 and a 51-yard field goal. The Cardinals replied with running back Beanie Wells getting a 2-yard touchdown run. The Seahawks continued to score with Mare hitting a 24-yard field goal, but the Cardinals responded in the fourth quarter with kicker Jay Feely getting a 24-yard field goal. The Seahawks pulled away with Mare making a 26-yard field goal.

With the win, the Seahawks improved to 4–2.

Week 8: at Oakland Raiders

Hoping to increase their winning streak the Seahawks flew to Oakland–Alameda County Coliseum where they played their former division rival, the Oakland Raiders. The Seahawks immediately trailed on a scoring rally by the Raiders with kicker Sebastian Janikowski nailing a 31-yard field goal. This was followed in the second quarter by quarterback Jason Campbell's 30-yard touchdown pass to FB Marcel Reece. Then in the third quarter Janikowski made a 36-yard field goal. Then he made a 22-yard field goal in the fourth quarter to put the Raiders up 16–0. The Seahawks struggled further with Campbell getting a 69-yard touchdown pass to wide receiver Darrius Heyward-Bey. The Seahawks would make their only score of the game with kicker Olindo Mare hitting a 47-yard field goal. However, they continued to trail as Janikowski made a 49-yard field goal, followed by running back Michael Bush making a 4-yard touchdown run.

With the loss, the Seahawks fell to 4–3.

Week 9: vs. New York Giants

The Seahawks' eighth game was an NFC duel with the Giants at home. The Giants took control with running back Ahmad Bradshaw getting a 2-yard touchdown run, followed by Eli Manning's 46-yard touchdown pass to wide receiver Hakeem Nicks, followed by Bradshaw's 4-yard touchdown run. In the second quarter, quarterback Eli Manning found wide receiver Steve Smith and tight end Kevin Boss on 6 and 5-yard touchdown passes respectively. The lead was expanded by kicker Lawrence Tynes who made a 25 and a 20-yard field goal. Seattle made their only score of the game, with quarterback Charlie Whitehurst completing a 36-yard touchdown pass to wide receiver Ben Obomanu.

With the loss, Seattle fell to 4–4. This also marks the first time that they lost to the Giants at home since 1981.

Week 10: at Arizona Cardinals

Hoping to rebound from their loss to the Giants the Seahawks flew to University of Phoenix Stadium for an NFC West rivalry match against the Cardinals. In the first quarter the Seahawks trailed early as running back Tim Hightower got a 2-yard touchdown run. They replied with running back Marshawn Lynch getting a 1-yard touchdown run. They took the lead with kicker Olindo Mare getting a 41-yard field goal, but the Cardinals replied with kicker Jay Feely nailing a 23-yard field goal. They took control with quarterback Matt Hasselbeck completing a 63-yard touchdown pass to wide receiver Deon Butler. This was followed in the third quarter by a 34, 19 and 23-yard field goal from Mare. In the fourth quarter Mare got another 19-yard field goal to put the Seahawks up 29–10. The Cardinals responded with quarterback Derek Anderson making a 2-yard touchdown pass to wide receiver Early Doucet (with a successful two-point conversion as Anderson found wide receiver Larry Fitzgerald), but the Seahawks put the game away with running back Justin Forsett getting a 4-yard touchdown run.

With the win, not only did the Seahawks improve to 5–4, but they swept the Cardinals for the first time since 2005.

Week 11: at New Orleans Saints

The Seahawks' tenth game was an NFC duel with the Saints. In the first quarter the Seahawks took the lead as kicker Olindo Mare hit a 20-yard field goal; but the Saints pulled ahead after running back Chris Ivory got a 1-yard touchdown run. The lead narrowed in the second quarter by Mare getting a 43-yard field goal, but the Seahawks fell further behind when quarterback Drew Brees made a 23 and a 3-yard touchdown pass to wide receiver Marques Colston and wide receiver Robert Meachem respectively. The Seahawks cut the lead again after quarterback Matt Hasselbeck got a 2-yard touchdown pass to wide receiver Ben Obomanu; but the Saints replied with Brees throwing a 22-yard touchdown pass to Colston. The Seahawks tried to cut the lead with Mare hitting a 43-yard field goal. The lead extended in the third quarter with Brees finding Meachem again on a 32-yard touchdown pass. The Seahawks made the only score of the fourth quarter with Mare making a 20-yard field goal; however, the Saints' defense closed off any more chances.

With the loss, Seattle fell to 5–5.

Week 12: vs. Kansas City Chiefs

Hoping to rebound from their loss to the Saints the Seahawks played on home ground where they played their former division rival, the Kansas City Chiefs. In the first quarter, the Seahawks trailed early with quarterback Matt Cassel getting a 7-yard touchdown pass to wide receiver Dwayne Bowe. They responded after free safety Earl Thomas returned a blocked punt 10 yards for a touchdown. They fell behind as Shaun Smith got a 1-yard touchdown run, followed by Cassel finding Bowe again on a 36-yard touchdown pass. The Seahawks cut the lead when kicker Olindo Mare got a 43-yard field goal, followed by quarterback Matt Hasselbeck getting a 13-yard touchdown pass to tight end Chris Baker. The struggled further with running back Jamaal Charles getting a 3-yard touchdown run, followed by Cassel throwing to Bowe on a 9-yard touchdown pass. The Seahawks responded as Hasselbeck completed an 87-yard touchdown pass to wide receiver Ben Obomanu, but the Chiefs increased their lead as Cassel got a 6-yard touchdown pass to tight end Tony Moeaki.

With the loss, Seattle fell to 5–6.

Week 13: vs. Carolina Panthers

Hoping to rebound from their loss to the Chiefs the Seahawks played on home ground for an NFC duel with the Panthers. In the first quarter the Seahawks trailed early as running back Mike Goodson got a 6-yard touchdown run, followed by running back Jonathan Stewart getting a 3-yard touchdown run. They commanded the rest of the game with kicker Olindo Mare getting a 24-yard field goal, followed by running back Marshawn Lynch getting a 1-yard touchdown run, then with Lofa Tatupu returning an interception 26 yards for a touchdown. The lead was extended with Lynch getting touchdown runs of 1 yard and 22 yards.

With the win, not only did the Seahawks improve to 6–6, they surpassed their victory mark of the last 2 seasons.

Week 14: at San Francisco 49ers

After their win over the Panthers the Seahawks flew to Candlestick Park for an NFC West rivalry match against the 49ers. The Seahawks trailed early with quarterback Alex Smith completing a 42-yard touchdown pass to tight end Vernon Davis, but they replied with quarterback Matt Hasselbeck throwing an 11-yard touchdown pass to wide receiver Ruvell Martin. They fell further behind when kicker Jeff Reed hit a 33 and a 44-yard field goal, followed by Smith completing a 15 and a 62-yard touchdown pass to Josh Morgan and Brian Westbrook respectively. This was followed by Reed making a 22-yard field goal, and in the third quarter with free safety Dashon Goldson returning an interception 39 yards for a touchdown. After that, Reed kicked a 36-yard field goal to put the 49ers up 40–7. The Seahawks tried to cut the lead down but only came away with running back Leon Washington returning the kickoff 92 yards for a touchdown, and in the fourth quarter with quarterback Matt Hasselbeck getting a 2-yard touchdown pass to wide receiver Deon Butler.

With the loss, Seattle fell to 6–7.

Week 15: vs. Atlanta Falcons

Hoping to rebound from their loss to the 49ers the Seahawks played on home ground for an NFC duel with the Falcons. In the first quarter the Seahawks took the lead with running back Marshawn Lynch getting a 1-yard touchdown run, with the Falcons replying with quarterback Matt Ryan making a 3-yard touchdown pass to fullback Jason Snelling. The Seahawks trailed slightly with kicker Matt Bryant hitting a 27-yard field goal, but managed to tie the game with kicker Olindo Mare nailing a 38-yard field goal. They struggled to keep up after Ryan completed a 24-yard touchdown pass to wide receiver Michael Jenkins, followed by quarterback Matt Hasselbeck losing the ball in the endzone which was picked up by defensive tackle Jonathan Babineaux for a touchdown. This was followed by Bryant getting a 25-yard field goal, and then with Ryan getting a 5-yard touchdown pass to wide receiver Roddy White. The Seahawks tried to cut the lead, but only came away with quarterback Charlie Whitehurst scrambling a yard for a touchdown.

With the loss, Seattle fell to 6–8.

Week 16: at Tampa Bay Buccaneers

Hoping to rebound from their loss to the Falcons the Seahawks flew to Raymond James Stadium for an NFC duel with the Buccaneers. The Seahawks took the early lead with quarterback Matt Hasselbeck scrambling 1 yard for a touchdown, but failed to maintain this lead with kicker Connor Barth hitting a 46-yard field goal, followed by quarterback Josh Freeman completing a 10 and a 20-yard touchdown pass to tight end Kellen Winslow and to wide receiver Mike Williams. The Seahawks fell further behind when Freeman connected with Winslow and Williams again on a 21 and a 7-yard touchdown pass. The Seahawks tried to come back with running back Leon Washington getting a 16-yard touchdown run (with a successful two-point conversion as quarterback Charlie Whitehurst connected with wide receiver Ben Obomanu), but struggled to keep up as Freeman made a 2-yard touchdown pass to wide receiver Maurice Stovall.

With the loss, Seattle fell to 6–9.

Week 17: vs. St. Louis Rams

Hoping to end their season on a positive note, the Seahawks went home for a Week 17 NFC West rematch with the St. Louis Rams, with the division title on the line. Seattle delivered the game's opening strike in the first quarter as quarterback Charlie Whitehurst found wide receiver Mike Williams on a 4-yard touchdown pass. The Rams answered in the second quarter with former Seahawks kicker Josh Brown making a 32-yard field goal.

St. Louis continued to pound away at Seattle's lead in the third quarter as Brown got a 27-yard field goal, but the Seahawks replied with a 31-yard field goal from kicker Olindo Mare. Afterwards, Seattle pulled away in the fourth quarter with Mare's 38-yard and 34-yard field goals.

With the win, not only did the Seahawks finish the regular season at 7–9, but they also won the NFC West for the first time since 2007 and secured the NFC's #4 seed. Also, Seattle became the first team in NFL history to make the playoffs in a non-strike season and become division champions with a losing record.

Postseason

Seattle entered the postseason as the #4 seed in the NFC.

Schedule

Game summaries

NFC Wild Card Playoff: vs. #5 New Orleans Saints

Entering the postseason as the NFC's #4 seed, the Seahawks began their playoff run at home in the NFC Wild Card Round against the #5 New Orleans Saints in a rematch of their Week 11 duel. Seattle trailed early in the first quarter as Saints kicker Garrett Hartley got a 26-yard field goal, followed by quarterback Drew Brees completing a 1-yard touchdown pass to fullback Heath Evans. The Seahawks answered with quarterback Matt Hasselbeck finding tight end John Carlson on an 11-yard touchdown pass. New Orleans responded in the second quarter with running back Julius Jones getting a 5-yard touchdown run, but Seattle took the lead with Hasselbeck connecting with Carlson again on a 7-yard touchdown pass, Mare booting a 29-yard field goal and Hasselbeck hooking up with wide receiver Brandon Stokley on a 45-yard touchdown pass. The Saints closed out the half with Hartley getting a 22-yard field goal.

The Seahawks added onto their lead in the third quarter as Hasselbeck found wide receiver Mike Williams on a 38-yard touchdown pass, followed by a 39-yard field goal from Mare. New Orleans ate away at their deficit in the fourth quarter with Jones' 4-yard touchdown run and Hartley's 21-yard field goal, but Seattle came right back with a 67-yard touchdown run from running back Marshawn Lynch. The Saints tried to rally with Brees completing a 6-yard touchdown pass to wide receiver Devery Henderson (with a failed two-point conversion), but a failed onside kick helped preserve Seattle's victory.

With the win, not only did the Seahawks improve their overall record to 8–9, but they became the first sub-.500 team in NFL history to win a playoff game as well as dethroning the defending world champion Saints from further playoff contention.

It was later determined that crowd activity and noise was so great, specifically during Marshawn Lynch's game-clinching touchdown run (commonly referred to as the Beast Quake), that a nearby seismic monitoring station registered a small tremor located at Qwest Field. With the win, the Seahawks had a 6–3 record at home for the season.

NFC Divisional Playoff: at #2 Chicago Bears

Coming off their win over the Saints, the Seahawks flew to Soldier Field for the NFC Divisional Round against the #2 Chicago Bears, in a rematch of their Week 6 matchup. Seattle trailed early in the first quarter as Bear quarterback Jay Cutler completed a 58-yard touchdown pass to tight end Greg Olsen, followed by running back Chester Taylor getting a 1-yard touchdown run. Chicago added onto their lead in the second quarter as Cutler got a 6-yard touchdown run.

The Bears continued their dominating day in the third quarter as Cutler got a 9-yard touchdown run. Seattle finally answered with a 30-yard field goal from kicker Olindo Mare. The Seahawks tried to rally in the fourth quarter as quarterback Matt Hasselbeck found wide receiver Mike Williams on a 38-yard touchdown pass, but Chicago pulled away with Cutler completing a 39-yard touchdown pass to tight end Kellen Davis. Seattle continued to try to rally as Hasselbeck connected with Williams again on a 3-yard touchdown pass, followed by a 9-yard touchdown pass to wide receiver Brandon Stokley, but the Bears held on to preserve the win.

With the loss, the Seahawks' season came to an end with an overall record at 8–10.

References

Seattle Seahawks
NFC West championship seasons
Seattle Seahawks seasons
Seattle Seahawks